The Stephanian is a stage in the regional stratigraphy of northwest Europe with an age between roughly 304 and 299 Ma (million years ago). It is a subdivision of the Carboniferous system or period and the regional Silesian series. The uppermost units of the Coal Measures of England and Wales are probably of Stephanian age, though the larger part of this formation is referred to the earlier  Westphalian. The stage derives its name from the city of Saint-Étienne for its coal mining basin in eastern central France (which itself derives from associations with Saint Stephen) where strata of this age occur.

In the official geologic timescale of the ICS, the Stephanian is placed within the Pennsylvanian epoch (318-299 Ma).

The (regionally defined) Stephanian stage corresponds to the (internationally used) Gzhelian. References appear in scientific literature to a Stephanian epoch or Stephanian series reflecting the stage's earlier status.

References

Carboniferous geochronology
Pennsylvanian geochronology
.
Gzhelian
Stratigraphy of Europe